Alexander's kusimanse (Crossarchus alexandri) is a mongoose species native to Central African rainforests up to an elevation of .

It feeds on grubs, small rodents, small reptiles, crabs, and some fruits. It can produce 2 to 3 litters (2 to 4 young per litter) of young each year after a gestation period of 8 weeks. The young wean at 3 weeks old and reach sexual maturity at 9 months old.

References

External links

Alexander's kusimanse. The Animal Files.

Alexander's kusimanse
Mammals of Uganda
Mammals of the Democratic Republic of the Congo
Alexander's kusimanse
Alexander's kusimanse